Naservand may refer to various villages in Iran:

Naservand, Khorramabad
Naservand, Selseleh
Naservand-e Rahimi